Dara Khosrowshahi (born May 28, 1969) is an Iranian-American businessman and the chief executive officer of Uber. Khosrowshahi was previously CEO of Expedia Group, a company that owns several travel fare aggregators. He is also a member of the board of directors of BET.com and Hotels.com, and previously served on the board of The New York Times Company.

Early life and education
Khosrowshahi was born in 1969 in Iran into a wealthy family and grew up in a mansion on the family compound. He is the youngest of the three children of Lili and Asghar (Gary) Khosrowshahi. His family founded the Alborz Investment Company, a diversified conglomerate involved in pharmaceuticals, chemicals, food, distribution, packaging, trading, and services.

In 1978, just before the Iranian Revolution, his family was targeted for its wealth and his mother decided to leave everything behind and flee the country. Their company was later nationalized. His family first fled to southern France. They were planning to come back to Iran if the revolution failed, but when that didn't happen, they immigrated to the United States, eventually moving in with one of his uncles in Tarrytown, New York. In 1982, when Khosrowshahi was 13 years old, his father went to Iran to care for his grandfather. His father was not allowed to leave Iran for 6 years and therefore Khosrowshahi spent his teenage years without seeing his father. 

In 1987, he graduated from the Hackley School, a private university-preparatory school in Tarrytown. In 1991, he graduated with a B.S. in electrical and electronics engineering from Brown University, where he was a member of the social fraternity Sigma Chi.

Career
In 1991, Khosrowshahi joined Allen & Company, an investment bank, as an analyst. In 1998, he left Allen & Company to work for one of his former clients at the bank, Barry Diller, first at Diller's USA Networks, where he held the positions of senior vice president for strategic planning and then president, and later as chief financial officer of IAC, another company controlled by Diller.

In 2001, IAC purchased Expedia, and in August 2005, Khosrowshahi became CEO of Expedia. Ten years later, in 2015, Expedia gave him $90 million in stock options as part of a long-term employment agreement, conditioned on him staying with the company until 2020.

In June 2013, he received a Pacific Northwest Entrepreneur of the Year award from Ernst & Young.

In 2016, he was one of the highest paid CEOs in the United States. During his tenure as CEO of Expedia, "the gross value of its hotel and other travel bookings more than quadrupled and its pre-tax earnings more than doubled." Under Khosrowshahi, Expedia extended its presence to more than 60 countries and acquired Travelocity, Orbitz, and HomeAway.

In August 2017, Khosrowshahi became the CEO of Uber, succeeding founder Travis Kalanick. He was initially viewed as a "dark horse" candidate in case the initial frontrunners, General Electric's Jeff Immelt and Hewlett Packard Enterprise's Meg Whitman, fell through. However, when Immelt flubbed his presentation, Immelt's initial supporters threw their backing to Khosrowshahi. This included Kalanick, even though Khosrowshahi had made clear that under his watch, Kalanick would have no role in Uber's daily operations; as he put it in one of his slides, "there cannot be two CEOs." After several deadlocked votes, Benchmark, a venture capital firm that had helped lead the effort to push out Kalanick, promised to drop a lawsuit against Kalanick if it named Whitman as CEO. Several of the directors read the announcement as blackmail. One of Whitman's supporters switched his vote to Khosrowshahi, breaking the deadlock and making him Uber's second full-time CEO.

He forfeited his un-vested stock options of Expedia, then worth $184 million, but Uber reportedly paid him over $200 million to take the CEO position. He also serves on Uber's board of directors.

Khosrowshahi's main task was to clean up the image of a company that had become one of the most despised in the country, in part due to revelations about Uber's corporate culture. He replaced Kalanick's once-inviolable 14 values, which contained such items as "super pumped" and "always be hustlin'," with eight values focusing on "customer obsession". At all of his public appearances after taking over, Khosrowshahi stressed the message, "We do the right thing. Period."

In May 2019, Khosrowshahi led Uber in its initial public offering, which he addressed with employees in a company-wide letter.

Khosrowshahi is on the list of "Prominent Iranian-Americans" published by the U.S. Virtual Embassy Iran.

Political activity
Khosrowshahi is an outspoken critic of the immigration policy of Donald Trump. In 2016, he donated to the Hillary Victory Fund, Washington Democratic Senator Patty Murray, and the Democratic National Committee. He also donated to Utah Republican Senator Mike Lee, a supporter of libertarianism.

In November 2019, Khosrowshahi caused controversy in an interview with Axios on HBO, when he compared the assassination of Jamal Khashoggi to the death of Elaine Herzberg by an Uber self-driving car in 2018. He called them both "mistakes" that can "be forgiven". The Saudi government is an investor in Uber and has representation on its board of directors.

Personal life
Khosrowshahi has two children from a first marriage; a son, Alex and a daughter, Chloe. On December 12, 2012, Khosrowshahi married Sydney Shapiro, a former preschool teacher and actress. He praised his wife for wearing a Slayer t-shirt to the wedding, which was held in Las Vegas. The couple has twin sons, Hayes Epic and Hugo Gubrit.

His uncle, Hassan Khosrowshahi, also fled Iran due to the Iranian Revolution and is now a billionaire. His cousin Amir co-founded Nervana Systems, which was acquired by Intel in 2016 for $408 million. Another cousin, Golnar, founded Reservoir Media in 2007 as a music publishing company. He is also related to Darian Shirazi, the founder of Radius Intelligence and the first intern hired by Facebook.

See also
 List of Iranian Americans
Timeline of Uber

References

External links 

 Dara Khosrowshahi on Uber
 
 Uber gave CEO Dara Khosrowshahi $45 million in total pay last year, but it paid its COO even more, Troy Wolverton, Business Insider India, 12 April 2019

Living people
1969 births
People from Tehran
Iranian emigrants to the United States
Exiles of the Iranian Revolution in the United States
Brown University School of Engineering alumni
Iranian businesspeople
American chief executives
Directors of Uber
Expedia Group people
Businesspeople of Iranian descent
Hackley School alumni